The 2011–12 San Diego Toreros men's basketball team represented the University of San Diego in the 2011–12 NCAA Division I men's basketball season. This was head coach Bill Grier's fifth season at San Diego. The Toreros competed in the West Coast Conference and played their home games at Jenny Craig Pavilion. They finished the season 13–8, 7–9 in WCC play to finish in sixth place and lost in the quarterfinals of the West Coast Conference tournament to BYU.

Roster
Source

Schedule and results
Source
All times are Pacific

|-
!colspan=9| Regular season

|-
!colspan=9| 2012 West Coast Conference men's basketball tournament

Player Dismissals
On November 10, head coach Bill Grier announced that junior center Chris Gabriel and sophomore guard Jordan Mackie were dismissed from the team for the year. Reasons for their dismissal weren't announced.

References

San Diego Toreros
San Diego Toreros men's basketball seasons